Sanu Sherpa (born 1975) is a Nepalese mountaineer from, Makalu, Sankhuwasabha. On 21 July 2022, he became the first person to climb all of the 14 highest peaks in the world, known as the eight-thousanders, twice-over. He made his first ascent of all the 14 eight-thousanders between 2006 and 2019, becoming the 42nd person to do so in history. Before starting climbing as a porter, Sanu was previously a herdsman in Sankhuwasabha District in his early life.

Eight-thousander ascents
 Annapurna – 2016, 2021, 2022
 Broad Peak – 2014, 2017
 Cho Oyu – 2006, 2008
 Dhaulagiri – 2019, 2021, 2022
 Everest – 2007, 2008, 2009, 2012, 2013, 2016, 2017
 Gasherbrum II – 2019, 2022
 Gasherbrum I – 2013, 2019, 2022
 K2 – 2012, 2021
 Kanchenjunga – 2014, 2022
 Lhotse – 2008, 2021, 2022
 Makalu – 2019, 2022
 Manaslu – 2010, 2011, 2016
 Nanga Parbat – 2017, 2018, 2022
 Shishapangma – 2006, 2011

See also
 Nirmal Purja, a mountaineer with the record for the fastest ascent of all fourteen highest peaks.

References 

Nepalese mountain climbers
Living people
Sherpa summiters of Mount Everest
1975 births
Summiters of all 14 eight-thousanders
Summiters of K2